Grace Lee Nute (13 October 1895, in North Conway, New Hampshire – 4 May 1990, in Menlo Park, California) was a history professor and curator of manuscripts. She was among the pioneers of using microfilm to preserve information from manuscripts and increase their accessibility.

Biography
Nute graduated in 1917 with an A.B. in American literature from Smith College, in 1918 with an A.M. from Radcliffe College, and in 1921 with a Ph.D. in American history from Harvard University. At the Minnesota Historical Society in St. Paul she was from 1921 to 1946 the curator of manuscripts and from 1946 to 1957 a research associate. In 1927 she became an assistant professor at Hamline University in St. Paul.

Nute wrote books and articles on the North American fur trade and the French exploration of Minnesota. For the academic year 1934–1935 she was awarded a Guggenheim Fellowship for the purpose of writing of a joint biography of the French explorers Médard Chouart and Pierre-Esprit Radisson. She wrote articles for the Mississippi Valley Historical Review, the American Historical Review, and the Dictionary of American Biography, as well as several journals that are mainly of interest to residents of the state of Minnesota.

Selected publications

References

1895 births
1990 deaths
American women historians
20th-century American historians
20th-century American women writers
Smith College alumni
Radcliffe College alumni
Harvard University alumni
Hamline University faculty
People from North Conway, New Hampshire
American women curators
American curators